MZD may refer to:
 Méndez Airport, the IATA code MZD
 ISO 639:mzd, the ISO 639 code for the Limba language (Cameroon)
 Moscow Railway, a subsidiary of Russian Railways
 MK MZD, an orbital railway in Moscow